The 17th Indian Division was formed in 1917 from units of the British Indian Army for service in the Mesopotamia Campaign during World War I. After the war, it formed part of the occupation force for Iraq and took part in the Iraq Rebellion in 1920.  In August 1923, the division was reduced to a single brigade.

History

The 17th Indian Division started forming in Mesopotamia from August 1917 with the 50th, 51st, and 52nd Indian Brigades.  Shortly after being formed, the 50th Brigade exchanged places with the 34th Indian Brigade of 15th Indian Division.

Most of the infantry battalions that had already been in Mesopotamia for some months, guarding lines of communications so were somewhat acclimatized and accustomed to the country.  The division was involved in the action at Fat-ha Gorge on the Little Zab between 23–26 October 1918 and the Battle of Sharqat, 28–30 October 1918 under command of I Corps

At the end of the war, the 17th Division was chosen to form part of the occupation force for Iraq.  It took part in the Iraq Rebellion in 1920.  In August 1923, the division was reduced to a single brigade; the last British troops left in March 1927 and the Indian ones in November 1928.

Order of battle
The division commanded the following units, although not all of them served at the same time:

34th Indian Brigade
 2nd Battalion, Queen's Own (Royal West Kent Regiment)
 31st Punjabis
 1st Battalion, 112th Infantry
 114th Mahrattas
 129th Machine Gun Company
 34th Light Trench Mortar Battery

51st Indian Brigade
 1st Battalion, Highland Light Infantry
 1st Battalion, 2nd Queen Victoria's Own Rajput Light Infantry
 14th Ferozepore Sikhs
 1st Battalion, 10th Gurkha Rifles
 257th Machine Gun Company
 51st Light Trench Mortar Battery

52nd Indian Brigade
 1/6th Battalion, Hampshire Regiment
 45th Rattray's Sikhs
 84th Punjabis
 1st Battalion, 94th Russell's Infantry
 1st Battalion, 113th Infantry
 258th Machine Gun Company
 52nd Light Trench Mortar Battery

Divisional Artillery
 CCXX Brigade, Royal Field Artillery (1064th, 1065th, 403rd (H) and Anglo-Indian Batteries)
 CCXXI Brigade, Royal Field Artillery (1067th, 1068th, 404th (H) and Volunteer Batteries)
 X.17 Medium Trench Mortar Battery
 17th Divisional Ammunition Column

Engineers and Pioneers
 Sirmoor, Tehri Garhwal and Malerkotla Sappers and Miners, ISF
 17th Division Signal Company, Royal Engineers Signal Service
 1st Battalion, 32nd Sikh Pioneers

Divisional Troops
 276th Machine Gun Company
 17th Machine Gun Battalion
 3rd, 19th, 35th and 36th Combined Field Ambulances, RAMC
 No. 7 Mobile Veterinary Section, AVC
 17th Division Train, ASC

Commanders
The division was commanded from 25 August 1917 by Major-General W. Gillman.  On 17 December 1917, Major-General G.A.J. Leslie took command.

See also

 List of Indian divisions in World War I

Notes

References

Further reading

External links
 
 

British Indian Army divisions
Indian World War I divisions
Military units and formations established in 1917
Military units and formations disestablished in 1923